The following is a list of notable deaths in June 2020.

Entries for each day are listed alphabetically by surname. A typical entry lists information in the following sequence:
 Name, age, country of citizenship at birth, subsequent country of citizenship (if applicable), reason for notability, cause of death (if known), and reference.

June 2020

1
Javier Alva Orlandini, 92, Peruvian politician, Vice President (1980–1985), President of the Senate (1981–1982).
Jean-Michel Cadiot, 67, French writer and journalist.
Silver Donald Cameron, 82, Canadian journalist and author.
Garth Dawley, 86, Canadian journalist, amyotrophic lateral sclerosis.
Pat Dye, 80, American Hall of Fame college football player (Georgia Bulldogs), athletic director and coach (East Carolina Pirates, Auburn Tigers).
Asif Farrukhi, 60, Pakistani writer.
Majek Fashek, 57, Nigerian reggae singer and songwriter.
Marian Filar, 77, Polish lawyer, academic and politician, member of the Sejm (2007–2011).
Lee Grosscup, 83, American football player (New York Giants) and broadcaster (ABC).
John Hartigan, 80, American Olympic rower (1968), respiratory failure.
Bill Hill, 84, American Canadian football player (Edmonton Eskimos).
Joey Image, 63, American drummer (Misfits), liver cancer.
Dave Kelly, 64, American darts player.
Janez Kocijančič, 78, Slovenian politician and lawyer, Deputy (1993–1996).
K. N. Lakshmanan, 89, Indian politician, Tamil Nadu MLA (since 2001).
Ron Larrieu, 83, American Olympic athlete (1964).
Daniel Levy, 89, Israeli Olympic basketball player (1952).
Colin Manlove, 78, Scottish literary critic and editor.
David McAtee, 53, American barbecue stand owner, shot.
Roberto Peccei, 78, Italian physicist, co-formulator of the Peccei–Quinn theory.
Giyannedra Prasad, 60, Fijian lawyer and politician, member and Deputy Speaker of Parliament (1999–2000), cancer.
Nicolas Rea, 3rd Baron Rea, 91, British hereditary peer and politician.
Piotr Rocki, 46, Polish footballer (Polonia Warsaw, Górnik Zabrze, Dyskobolia Grodzisk Wielkopolski), ruptured aneurysm.
Douglas Rolfe, 67, Australian cricketer (Victoria, South Australia).
Pedro Ercílio Simon, 78, Brazilian Roman Catholic prelate, Archbishop of Passo Fundo (2011–2012) and Bishop of Uruguaiana (1995–1998).
Myroslav Skoryk, 81, Ukrainian composer.
Josef Smolka, 81, Czech volleyball player, Olympic bronze medalist (1968).
Christoph Sydow, 35, German journalist (Der Spiegel), suicide.
Marion Zarzeczna, 89, American pianist.

2
Arrogate, 7, American Thoroughbred racehorse, Breeders' Cup Classic winner (2016) and American Champion Three-Year-Old Male Horse (2016), euthanized.
Brad Babcock, 81, American college baseball coach (James Madison).
Ghulam Murtaza Baloch, 55, Pakistani politician, member of the Provincial Assembly of Sindh (since 2016), COVID-19.
Werner Böhm, 78, German singer and musician.
Geoffrey Burnstock, 91, English-born Australian neuroscientist.
Jono Clarke, 76, Zimbabwean cricketer (Rhodesia).
Hiber Conteris, 86, Uruguayan writer, playwright, and literary critic.
John Cuneo, 91, Australian sailor, Olympic champion (1972).
David Dorn, 77, American police officer, shot.
James F. English Jr., 93, American bank executive (Connecticut Bank and Trust Company) and academic administrator, president of Trinity College (Connecticut) (1981–1989).
Paolo Fabbri, 81, Italian semiotician.
Lugi Gizenga, 54, Congolese politician.
Roberto Gervaso, 82, Italian writer and journalist, cancer.
Mary Pat Gleason, 70, American actress (Guiding Light, A Cinderella Story, Mom), Emmy winner (1986), cancer.
Gerald Jay Goldberg, 90, American author.
Jean-Claude Hamel, 90, French football executive, President of Auxerre (1963–2009).
Gaynel Hodge, 83, American doo-wop singer (The Platters), pianist and songwriter ("Earth Angel").
Leslie Kay, 98, British-born New Zealand electrical engineer and academic.
Rusty Kidd, 74, American politician, member of the Georgia House of Representatives (2009–2017).
Yvon Lamarre, 85, Canadian politician.
John Luk Jok, 68, South Sudanese politician, Minister of Justice (2011–2013).
Henadz Mardas, 49, Belarusian footballer (Neman Grodno, BATE Borisov), bowel cancer. </ref>
Sean Monterrosa, 22, American protester, shot.
Des Moore, 94, Australian Roman Catholic prelate, Bishop of Alotau-Sideia (1970–2001).
Jacques Noyer, 93, French Roman Catholic prelate, Bishop of Amiens (1987–2003).
Munir Khan Orakzai, 60, Pakistani politician, MP (2002–2013, since 2018), heart attack.
Jean Pineau, 97, French politician, Deputy (1978–1981).
Janine Reiss, 99, French vocal coach and harpsichordist.
Muriel Kent Roy, 98, Canadian demographer.
Riaz Sheikh, 51, Pakistani cricketer (Pakistan National Shipping Corporation).
Héctor Suárez, 81, Mexican actor (National Mechanics, El buscabullas, El derecho de nacer) and comedian.
Lindsay Townsend, 86, New Zealand rugby union player (Otago, national team).
Chris Trousdale, 34, American actor and singer (Dream Street), COVID-19.
Carlo Ubbiali, 90, Italian motorcycle road racer, nine-time world champion, respiratory failure.
Wes Unseld, 74, American Hall of Fame basketball player and coach (Washington Bullets), pneumonia.
Floyd Zaiger, 94, American fruit breeder.

3
Atta Muhammad Bhanbhro, 84, Pakistani writer and translator.
Oscar Brown, 74, American baseball player (Atlanta Braves).
Shaukat Manzoor Cheema, 66, Pakistani politician, Punjab MPA (since 2008), COVID-19.
Abdelmalek Droukdel, 50, Algerian Islamic militant, founder of Al-Qaeda in the Islamic Maghreb, shot.
Bob Dupuis, 84, American ice hockey player (Boston University Terriers).
Bruce Jay Friedman, 90, American author and screenwriter (Splash, Doctor Detroit, Stir Crazy).
Jeanne Goosen, 81, South African writer.
Marc de Hond, 42, Dutch television presenter and wheelchair basketball player, cancer.
Mohsen Ibrahim, 85, Lebanese politician.
Mian Jamshed Uddin Kakakhel, 65, Pakistani politician, Khyber Pakhtunkhwa MPA (since 2018), COVID-19.
István Kausz, 87, Hungarian fencer, Olympic champion (1964).
Veli Lehtelä, 84, Finnish rower, Olympic bronze medalist (1956, 1960).
Jerzy Łukaszewski, 95, Polish diplomat and academic, Rector of the College of Europe (1972–1990).
Donald Macgregor, 81, Scottish Olympic runner (1972).
Johnny Majors, 85, American Hall of Fame football player (Tennessee Volunteers) and coach (Pitt Panthers, Iowa State Cyclones), national championship (1976).
Héctor Ortega, 81, Mexican actor (Las fuerzas vivas, Santa sangre, Lucía, Lucía).
Pleasantly Perfect, 22, American racehorse and sire, Breeders' Cup Classic (2003) and Dubai World Cup (2004) winner.
Gary Potts, 75, Canadian Temagami First Nation chief.
Tony Romandini, 91, Canadian jazz guitarist and composer.
Adriano Silva, 49, Brazilian politician, complications from COVID-19.
Pritam Singh, 78, Indian academic.
Mário Rino Sivieri, 78, Italian-born Brazilian Roman Catholic prelate, Bishop of Propriá (1997–2017).
Sheikh Tahir Rasheed, 66, Pakistani politician, MP (1993–1999) and Punjab MPA (1990–1993), liver cancer.
Valentina Tăzlăuanu, 70, Moldovan essayist, journalist and theatre critic.
Maria Alice Vergueiro, 85, Brazilian actress (O Corpo, Cronicamente Inviável), pneumonia.
Lawrence M. Walsh Sr., 72, American politician, member of the Illinois State Senate (1997–2005), prostate cancer.
Midge Ware, 92, American actress (Gunslinger, The Phil Silvers Show).
Ray Webster, 82, American baseball player (Cleveland Indians, Boston Red Sox).
Conrad Worrill, 78, American writer and political activist.

4
Marcello Abbado, 93, Italian pianist and composer.
Earl Brown, 92, American lieutenant general.
Ralph Caplan, 95, American design consultant and writer.
Basu Chatterjee, 93, Indian film director (Us Paar, Piya Ka Ghar, Chameli Ki Shaadi).
Max Clendinning, 95, Northern Irish furniture designer and architect.
Walt Elliot, 86, Canadian politician.
Kathryn Hach-Darrow, 97, American businesswoman.
Laura Hillman, 96, German-born American Holocaust survivor.
Rupert Hine, 72, English musician (Quantum Jump), songwriter and record producer (The Fixx, Howard Jones), cancer.
Mikhail Kokshenov, 83, Russian actor (Zhenya, Zhenechka and Katyusha, The Garage, Sportloto-82), film director and producer.
Pieter van der Kruk, 78, Dutch Olympic weightlifter (1968) and shot putter.
Jean Link, 80, Luxembourgian Olympic fencer (1960).
Bobby Locke, 86, American baseball player (Cleveland Indians, Philadelphia Phillies).
Roberto Faraone Mennella, 48, Italian jewelry designer, cancer.
Dulce Nunes, 90, Brazilian artist, composer, singer and music producer, COVID-19.
Bamidele Olumilua, 80, Nigerian politician, Governor of Ondo State (1992–1993).
Steve Priest, 72, British bassist and singer (The Sweet).
James P. Quirk, 93, American economist.
Pete Rademacher, 91, American boxer, Olympic champion (1956).
Antonio Rodríguez de las Heras, 72, Spanish historian and academic, COVID-19.
Don E. Schultz, 86, American marketing theorist and professor.
Albert N. Whiting, 102, American academic administrator, President of North Carolina Central University (1966–1983).

5
Howard Allen, 71, American serial killer.
Deborah Washington Brown, 68, American computer scientist.
Andrée Champagne, 80, Canadian actress (Les Belles Histoires des pays d'en haut) and politician, MP (1984–1993, 2005–2014).
Jonathan Dowling, 65, Irish-American theoretical physicist.
Jim Fryatt, 79, English footballer (Bradford Park Avenue, Oldham Athletic, Southport).
Boris Gaganelov, 78, Bulgarian football player (Belasita Petrich, CSKA Sofia, national team) and manager.
Doris Goodale, 71, American politician, member of the Arizona House of Representatives (2009–2015).
Jiří Hanák, 82, Czech journalist and dissident, Charter 77 signatory.
Rosemary Hollis, 68, British political scientist.
A. Dale Kaiser, 92, American biochemist and developmental biologist, complications from Parkinson's disease.
Tomisaku Kawasaki, 95, Japanese pediatrician, discoverer of Kawasaki disease.
Vilhelm Kraus, 71, Bulgarian politician, Minister of Transport (1997–1999).
Carlos Lessa, 83, Brazilian economist, COVID-19.
Kristin Linklater, 84, Scottish actress, acting and vocal coach.
Ved Marwah, 85, Indian police officer, governor of Mizoram (2000–2001), Manipur (1999–2003) and Jharkhand (2000–2004).
John Miller, 79, American baseball player (Baltimore Orioles), heart failure.
James Albert Murray, 87, American Roman Catholic prelate, Bishop of Kalamazoo (1998–2009).
George V. Murry, 71, American Roman Catholic prelate, Bishop of Saint Thomas (1999–2007) and Youngstown (since 2007), leukemia.
Betty Ann Norton, 83, Irish acting teacher.
Mary Overlie, 74, American choreographer, dancer and writer (the Six Viewpoints).
Ko Si-chi, 90, Taiwanese photographer.
Friedrich Stelzner, 98, German surgeon and educator.
Kurt Thomas, 64, American Hall of Fame gymnast, world champion (1978, 1979), complications from basilar stroke.
Ron Thompson, 88, English footballer (Carlisle United), bowel cancer.
Marian Tomaszewski, 97, Polish scout leader, officer and tank commander (2nd Polish Corps).
Vicki Wood, 101, American racing driver (NASCAR).
Xu Sihai, 74, Chinese teapot creator and collector, expert on purple Yixing clay teapots, founder of the Sihai Teapot Museum.
Shigeru Yokota, 87, Japanese author and human rights activist, founder of National Association for the Rescue of Japanese Kidnapped by North Korea.

6
Arthur Berman, 85, American politician, member of the Illinois House of Representatives (1969–1976) and Senate (1977–2000).
Jean-Marie Bourgeois, 80, French Olympic skier (1968).
Reche Caldwell, 41, American football player (San Diego Chargers, New England Patriots, Washington Redskins), shot.
Jean-Marc Chaput, 89, Canadian author and public speaker, bone cancer.
Dan Danglo, 95, American cartoonist (Felix the Cat).
Earl Davie, 93, American biochemist.
Christel DeHaan, 77, German-born American timeshare exchange executive and philanthropist, founder of RCI and Christel House International.
Milt Earnhart, 102, American politician, member of the Arkansas House of Representatives (1959–1966) and Senate (1967–1980).
Alain Erlande-Brandenburg, 82, French art historian.
Allan Evans, 64, American record producer and musicologist.
Corey Fischer, 75, American actor (M*A*S*H, Brewster McCloud, McCabe & Mrs. Miller), complications from a brain aneurysm.
Thomas Freeman, 100, American educator and debate coach.
Uttam Gada, 72, Indian screenwriter and playwright, chronic lymphocytic leukemia.
Chandrakanta Goyal, 88, Indian politician, Maharashtra MLA (1990–1995).
Hsu Kun-yuan, 63, Taiwanese politician, speaker of the Kaohsiung City Council (since 2018), suicide by jumping.
Marjan, 72, Iranian singer and actress.
Jordi Mestre, 38, Spanish actor (Sé lo que hicisteis...) and model, traffic collision.
Bill Oster, 87, American baseball player (Philadelphia Athletics).
Zambrose Abdul Rahman, 76, Malaysian Olympic hurdler (1968).
Lester Ryan, 61, Irish hurler (Clara, Kilkenny), traffic collision.
T. Terrell Sessums, 89, American politician, member (1963–1974) and speaker (1972–1974) of the Florida House of Representatives.
Dietmar Seyferth, 91, German-born American chemist, complications from COVID-19.
Eduard Shaihullin, 45, Russian motorcycle speedway rider.
Ramadan Shalah, 62, Palestinian Islamic militant, Secretary-general of the Islamic Jihad Movement in Palestine (1995–2018), complications from heart surgery.
Francesco Squillace, 94, Italian lawyer and politician, president of the Province of Catanzaro (1975).
Malcolm Terris, 79, English actor (When the Boat Comes In, Coronation Street, The Plague Dogs).
Jayamohan Thampi, 64, Indian cricketer (Kerala).
Andrea Veggio, 96, Italian Roman Catholic prelate, Auxiliary Bishop of Verona (1983–2001).
Constantin Xenakis, 88, Egyptian-born Greek painter.
John Zook, 72, American football player (Atlanta Falcons, St. Louis Cardinals), cancer.

7
Sir Michael Beavis, 90, British Royal Air Force officer.
Frank Bey, 74, American blues singer.
Marina Blagojević, 62, Serbian sociologist.
Jean Bolinder, 84, Swedish author.
Paul Boundoukou-Latha, 67, Gabonese diplomat and politician.
Hubert Gagnon, 73, Canadian actor (Nic and Pic) and voice dubber (Homer Simpson), cancer.
Józef Gruszka, 73, Polish politician, member of the Sejm (1993–2005) and chairman of the PKN Orlen investigation commission (2004–2005).
Bettina Heinen-Ayech, 82, German painter.
Denis Howe, 91, English football (Southend United, Darlington, West Ham United).
Doris Jones-Baker, 94, British-American historian and folklorist.
Floyd Lee, 86, American blues musician (Music Under New York), heart failure.
Paul Lombard, 92, French politician, mayor of Martigues (1968–2009).
Péter Marót, 75, Hungarian fencer, Olympic silver medallist (1972), traffic collision.
Oliver McGee, 62, American political analyst and strategist.
James D. Meindl, 87, American engineer.
Alan Metter, 77, American film director (Back to School, Girls Just Want to Have Fun), heart attack.
Ken Riley, 72, American football player (Cincinnati Bengals) and coach (Florida A&M Rattlers), heart attack.
Paul Rochester, 81, American football player (New York Jets, Dallas Texans), Super Bowl champion (1969).
Roger Saint-Vil, 70, Haitian footballer (Racing CH, Cincinnati Comets, national team).
Chiranjeevi Sarja, 39, Indian actor (Vayuputra, Varadhanayaka, Aatagara), heart attack.
Lynika Strozier, 35, American biologist and researcher, COVID-19.
Edith Thallaug, 90, Norwegian actress and operatic singer.
Ralph Wright, 72, English footballer (Bolton Wanderers, New York Cosmos, Miami Toros).

8
Klaus Berger, 79, German academic theologian.
Tobias Berggren, 80, Swedish poet.
Renzo Bulgarello, 72, Italian Olympic rower (1972).
R. L. Clark, 89, American politician, member of the North Carolina Senate (1995–1998).
Nicholas Cummings, 95, American psychologist and author.
Tony Dunne, 78, Irish football player (Manchester United, Bolton Wanderers, national team) and manager.
Manuel Felguérez, 91, Mexican abstract artist (Generación de la Ruptura), COVID-19.
Maggie Fitzgibbon, 91, Australian actress (Sunstruck).
James Hand, 67, American country music singer-songwriter.
Marion Hänsel, 71, French-born Belgian film director and screenwriter (Between the Devil and the Deep Blue Sea).
G. C. Jennings, 81, American politician, member of the Virginia House of Delegates (1982–1994).
Sedley Joseph, 80, Trinidadian footballer (national team), kidney disease.
Stan London, 94, American physician (St. Louis Cardinals).
Fabrizio Mioni, 89, Italian actor (Roland the Mighty, Hercules).
Tavares Moreira, 75, Portuguese economist, governor of the Bank of Portugal (1986–1992), cancer.
Sardar Dur Muhammad Nasir, 61, Pakistani politician, Balochistan MPA (2013–2018), COVID-19.
Pierre Nkurunziza, 55, Burundian politician, President (since 2005), heart attack.
Oliver Ongtawco, 78, Filipino bowler, heart attack.
Bonnie Pointer, 69, American singer (The Pointer Sisters), cardiac arrest.
Arjun Charan Sethi, 79, Indian politician, MP (1971–1977, 1980–1984, 1991–1996, since 1998).
Daniel Stolper, 85, American oboist.
Heli Susi, 90, Estonian teacher and translator.
Ian Taylor, 64, British commodity trading executive, chairman and CEO of Vitol, pneumonia.
Shim Wan-koo, 81, South Korean politician, MP (1985–1992) and mayor of Ulsan (1997–2002).
Stefan Vodenicharov, 75, Bulgarian academic, President of the Bulgarian Academy of Sciences (2012–2016) and Minister of Education (2013).

9
Parviz Aboutaleb, 78, Iranian football player (Rah Ahan, Esteghlal) and manager (national team), complications from Alzheimer's disease.
Joseph Mohsen Béchara, 85, Lebanese Maronite Catholic hierarch, Archbishop of Cyprus (1986–1988) and Antelias (1988–2012).
Paul Chapman, 66, Welsh rock guitarist (UFO, Lone Star).
Pau Donés, 53, Spanish singer-songwriter (Jarabe de Palo) and guitarist, cancer.
Michael Drosnin, 74, American author and journalist.
Anthony Obiagboso Enukeme, 76, Nigerian politician.
Tom Feamster, 89, American football player (Baltimore Colts).
Ödön Földessy, 90, Hungarian long jumper, Olympic bronze medallist (1952).
Kasirye Ggwanga, 68, Ugandan military officer, complications from brain surgery.
Simon Henshaw, 59, American diplomat, Ambassador to Guinea (since 2019).
Dick Johnson, 66, American news reporter (WMAQ-TV).
Noel Johnson, 47 American college basketball coach (Midwestern State), ovarian cancer.
Ain Kaalep, 94, Estonian writer and poet.
Kim Chang-sop, 74, North Korean politician, Vice Minister of the State Security Department (since 2015).
Nemir Kirdar, 83, Iraqi-British investment banker and financier, founder of Investcorp.
Krystyna Krupska-Wysocka, 84, Polish film director.
Francis Lagan, 85, Irish Roman Catholic prelate, Auxiliary Bishop of Derry (1988–2010).
Gwen Margolis, 85, American politician, member (1980–1992, 2002–2008, 2010–2016) and president (1990–1992) of the Florida Senate.
Chrysostomos P. Panayiotopoulos, 82, Greek neurologist, heart attack.
Jean-Philippe Reverdot, 67, French photographer.
William Russell Robinson, 78, American politician, member of the Pennsylvania House of Representatives (1989–2002).
Jeanne Rynhart, 74, Irish sculptor.
Ajay Singh, 69, Indian diplomat and politician.
Wang Dingguo, 108, Chinese politician, member of the Political Consultative Conference (1978–1993).
Jas Waters, 39, American television writer (This Is Us, Kidding) and columnist (Vibe), suicide by hanging.
Adam Wodnicki, 89, Polish translator and writer.

10
J. Anbazhagan, 62, Indian politician, MLA (2001–2006, since 2011), COVID-19.
Duilio Arigoni, 91, Swiss chemist.
Naresh Aula, 34, Indian footballer (ONGC).
Michel Bellen, 74, Belgian serial killer, heart failure.
Jesse Blackadder, 56, Australian novelist, screenwriter and journalist, pancreatic cancer.
Aloysius G. Casey, 88, American lieutenant general.
Justin Champion, 59, British historian.
Hans Cieslarczyk, 83, German football player (Borussia Dortmund, national team) and manager (SpVgg Fürth).
Joan Ferner, 87, Canadian-born New Zealand women's rights advocate.
Rosita Fornés, 97, Cuban-American actress (Musical Romance, The Unknown Mariachi) and singer, complications from emphysema.
Charlotte Gardner, 88, American politician, member of the North Carolina House of Representatives (1985–2001).
Harry Glickman, 96, American Hall of Fame sports executive (Portland Trail Blazers) and journalist (The Oregonian).
Antonio González Orozco, 87, Mexican muralist, cancer.
William Hale, 88, American film and television director (Gunfight in Abilene, Red Alert, Murder in Texas).
Murray Hill, 80, New Zealand seed technologist.
James Holland, 81, American politician, member of the New Hampshire House of Representatives (1975–1977).
Paul Johnson, 53, Canadian wheelchair tennis player and Paralympic athlete (1988).
Tom Keeping, 78, Canadian politician.
Dorothy Kovalchick, 94, American baseball player (Fort Wayne Daisies).
Anita Linda, 95, Filipino actress (Weighed But Found Wanting, Jaguar, Temptation Island).
Elizabeth-Ann de Massy, 73, Monegasque aristocrat.
Fred McIlhattan, 75, American politician, heart attack.
Hans Mezger, 90, German automotive engineer (Porsche).
Miliky MiCool, 53, Ghanaian actress, complications from high blood pressure.
Mr. Wrestling II, 85, American professional wrestler (GCW, Mid-South, CWF).
Murray Olderman, 98, American sports columnist, cartoonist and author.
Paul Owen, 51, Canadian cricketer (Gloucestershire).
Talat Özkarslı, 82, Turkish football player (Galatasaray, national team) and manager (Gaziantepspor).
Edward Ross Ritvo, 90, American psychiatrist.
Stuart Lyon Smith, 82, Canadian politician, Ontario MPP (1975–1982), leader of the Ontario Liberal Party (1976–1982).
William Tietz, 93, American veterinarian and academic administrator, president of Montana State University (1977–1990).
Claudell Washington, 65, American baseball player (Atlanta Braves, New York Yankees, Oakland Athletics), World Series champion (1974), prostate cancer.
Eppie Wietzes, 82, Dutch-born Canadian racing driver, heart failure.
Sarunyoo Wongkrachang, 59, Thai actor (13 Beloved, Ong Bak 2) and film director (Kon Khon), liver cancer.
Zoogin, 30, Swedish racehorse.

11
Mahjoub Ben Bella, 73, Algerian-born French painter.
Kraisak Choonhavan, 72, Thai politician, Senator (2000–2006), tongue cancer.
Katsuhisa Hattori, 83, Japanese composer (Fist of the North Star), heart failure.
Marjorie G. Horning, 102, American biochemist and pharmacologist.
Emmanuel Issoze-Ngondet, 59, Gabonese politician, Prime Minister (2016–2019) and Minister of Foreign Affairs (2012–2016), asthma.
Earnie Killum, 72, American basketball player (Los Angeles Lakers).
František Kotlaba, 93, Czech botanist and mycologist.
Roy Little Chief, 81, Canadian First Nations rights activist and politician, Chief of the Siksika Nation (1981–1983).
Rodolfo Machado, 82, Argentinian actor (Bajo el signo de la patria, El Picnic de los Campanelli).
Marcel Maréchal, 82, French actor (I as in Icarus, Fanfan, Julien Fontanes, magistrat) and film director.
Bernard J. Matkowsky, 80, American mathematician.
Basil Meeking, 90, New Zealand Roman Catholic prelate, Bishop of Christchurch (1987–1995).
Burton Natarus, 86, American politician, Chicago alderman (1971–2007).
Dennis O'Neil, 81, American comic book writer (Batman, Iron Man) and editor (Marvel Comics).
Stella Pevsner, 98, American author.
Matt Poore, 90, New Zealand cricketer (Canterbury, national team).
Sir Clem Renouf, 99, Australian accountant, president of Rotary International (1978–1979).
Hermann Salomon, 82, German Olympic athlete (1960, 1964, 1968).
Rosa Maria Sardà, 78, Spanish actress (Alegre ma non troppo, Carol's Journey, My Mother Likes Women) and comedian, Goya winner (1994, 2002), lymphoma.
Cy Strulovitch, 94, Canadian Olympic basketball player (1948).
Elly Stone, 93, American singer and actress.
Hosbet Suresh, 90, Indian jurist and human rights activist.
Stefania Świerzy, 86, Polish Olympic gymnast (1952).
Mel Winkler, 78, American actor (Devil in a Blue Dress, Crash Bandicoot, Doc Hollywood).

12
Joost Boks, 78, Dutch-born Canadian Olympic field hockey player (1964, 1968).
Claude A. Bray, Jr., 88, American politician, member of the Georgia House of Representatives (1967–1987).
Carl Brewer, 63, American politician, mayor of Wichita (2007–2015).
Rayshard Brooks, 27, American police detainee, shot.
Aileen Christianson, 75, Scottish academic and writer.
Gulzar Dehlvi, 93, Indian Urdu poet.
Carl Eiríksson, 90, Icelandic Olympic sports shooter (1992).
Lino Esterino Garavaglia, 92, Italian Roman Catholic prelate, Bishop of Tivoli (1987–1991) and Cesena-Sarsina (1991–2003).
Ali Hadi, 53, Iraqi football player (Al-Quwa Al-Jawiya, Al-Zawraa) and manager (Zakho), COVID-19.
Abani Mohan Joardar, 79, Indian politician, West Bengal MLA (since 2011).
Charles Wing Krafft, 72, American painter and ceramicist, cancer.
Malcolm Mabry, 86, American politician, member of the Mississippi House of Representatives (1964–1980) and Senate (1980–1988).
Geoffrey Martin, 92, Australian footballer (Launceston, Ulverstone, Burnie).
Claude Ndam, 65, Cameroonian singer-songwriter.
Molly Neptune Parker, 81, American basketweaver, cancer.
Chylgychy Ondar, 64, Russian politician, Deputy (1999–2007), COVID-19.
Juli Sanclimens i Genescà, 84, Spanish politician, Mayor of Manresa (1987–1995) and member of the Catalan Parliament (1984–1995).
William S. Sessions, 90, American civil servant, Director of the FBI (1987–1993), Judge (1974–1987) and Chief Judge (1980–1987) of the U.S. District Court for Western Texas.
Arthur Spatt, 94, American jurist, Judge of the U.S. District Court for Eastern New York (since 1989).
Ricky Valance, 84, Welsh singer ("Tell Laura I Love Her").
Albert Vitali, 64, Swiss politician, member of the National Council (since 2011), cancer.
Parasnath Yadav, 71, Indian politician, Uttar Pradesh MLA, bladder cancer.
Perfecto Yasay Jr., 73, Filipino politician, Secretary of Foreign Affairs (2016–2017), pneumonia complicated by cancer.

13
Sheikh Mohammed Abdullah, 74, Bangladeshi politician, Minister of Religious Affairs (since 2019), COVID-19.
Théophile Philippe Barakat, 67, Syrian Syriac Catholic hierarch, Archbishop of Homs (since 2016).
Leslie Cohen Berlowitz, 76, American academic administrator (American Academy of Arts and Sciences).
Sultan Uddin Bhuiyan, 69, Bangladeshi politician.
Eula Bingham, 90, American scientist.
Marj Carpenter, 93, American Presbyterian leader, missionary and reporter, Moderator of the General Assembly of the Presbyterian Church (1995–1996).
Ralph Doty, 78, American politician.
Pepe el Ferreiro, 78, Spanish archaeologist.
Kirvan Fortuin, 28, South African dancer and choreographer, stabbed.
Dick Garmaker, 87, American basketball player (Minneapolis Lakers, New York Knicks, Minnesota Golden Gophers).
Jim Grelle, 83, American Olympic middle-distance runner (1960).
Nic Jorge, 78, Filipino basketball coach (national team) and secretary general of the Basketball Association of the Philippines.
B. Kannan, 69, Indian cinematographer (Oru Nadigai Natakam Parkiral, Kadalora Kavithaigal, Solla Thudikuthu Manasu).
Weldon L. Kennedy, 81, American FBI agent.
Sabiha Khanum, 84, Pakistani actress (Do Ansoo, Mukhra, Anjuman), kidney disease.
Bram Kloppert, 73, Dutch boxer.
Mike McCormick, 81, American baseball player (San Francisco Giants, Baltimore Orioles, Kansas City Royals), Cy Young Award (1967), Parkinson's disease.
Donald W. Meinig, 95, American geographer.
Mags Murray, 58, Irish politician.
Mohammed Nasim, 72, Bangladeshi politician, MP (1986–1987, 1991–2006, since 2014), Minister of Home Affairs (1999–2001) and Health (2014–2019), stroke.
Luther Price, 58, American experimental filmmaker and visual artist.
Vasant Raiji, 100, Indian cricketer (Bombay, Baroda).
Maurice Rajsfus, 92, French writer and historian.
Jean Raspail, 94, French author (The Camp of the Saints, Moi, Antoine de Tounens, roi de Patagonie).
Helge Rykkja, 76, Norwegian writer and poet.
Nancy Saunders, 94, American actress (The Three Stooges), leukemia.
Lucy Scarbrough, 92, American classical pianist and teacher.
Colo Tavernier, 75, British-French screenwriter (A Week's Vacation, Beatrice, Story of Women), cancer.
Herbert T. Ueda, 91, American ice drilling engineer.
Tineke Verburg, 64, Dutch journalist and TV presenter.
Pramono Edhie Wibowo, 64, Indonesian military officer, Army Chief of Staff (2011–2013), heart attack.
Marc Zermati, 75, French record producer and promoter.

14
Saiful Azam, 79, Bangladeshi air force pilot.
Sally Banes, 69, American dance historian and critic, ovarian cancer.
Stefano Bertacco, 57, Italian politician.
Don Candy, 91, Australian tennis player, 1956 French Open champion.
Luce Douady, 16, French climber, world youth champion and European championships bronze medalist (2019), fall.
Ed Fitz Gerald, 96, American baseball player (Pittsburgh Pirates, Washington Senators, Cleveland Indians) and coach.
Jacqui Gasson, Welsh politician, lord mayor of Cardiff (2004–2005).
Betty Goudsmit-Oudkerk, 96, Dutch resistance member.
Sarah Hegazi, 30, Egyptian LGBT rights activist, suicide.
Ibidunni Ighodalo, 39, Nigerian beauty queen and businesswoman, cardiac arrest.
Elsa Joubert, 97, South African Sestigers writer, COVID-19.
Noel Kelly, 84, Australian rugby league player (Ipswich, Western Suburbs Magpies, national team).
Helena van der Kraan, 80, Dutch artist and photographer, cancer.
Mohammad-Ali Keshavarz, 90, Iranian actor (The Desert of the Tartars, The Fateful Day, Through the Olive Trees).
Simon Kverndal, 62, British barrister.
Pierre Lumbi, 70, Congolese politician, Senator (since 2016), COVID-19.
 Nurul Haque Manik, 55, Bangladeshi footballer  (Brothers Union, national team), brain hemorrhage.
Arunkumar Mehta, 80, Indian diamond and gem executive, CEO of Rosy Blue.
Aarón Padilla Gutiérrez, 77, Mexican footballer (Pumas, Atlante, national team), COVID-19.
Sushant Singh Rajput, 34, Indian actor (M.S. Dhoni: The Untold Story, Chhichhore, Detective Byomkesh Bakshy!), suicide by hanging.
Haroldo Rodas, 74, Guatemalan diplomat and politician, Minister of Foreign Affairs (2008–2012), COVID-19.
Claude Samuel, 88, French music critic and radio executive.
Keith Tippett, 72, British jazz pianist (King Crimson, Centipede) and composer.
Raj Mohan Vohra, 88, Indian military officer, COVID-19.
Tawfiq al-Yasiri, Iraqi politician, member of the IRDC, COVID-19.

15
B. Santosh Babu, 37, Indian military officer, beaten.
Winston Backus, 99, Canadian politician, Alberta MLA (1971–1979).
Mário Calixto Filho, 73, Brazilian politician, Senator for Rondônia (2004–2005), COVID-19.
Juan Díaz, 84, Chilean Olympic boxer (1960).
Lilia Dizon, 91, Filipino actress (The Moises Padilla Story).
José Gentil Rosa, 80, Brazilian politician, Maranhão MLA (1987–1991, 1995–1999, since 2019), complications from COVID-19.
Giulio Giorello, 75, Italian philosopher, COVID-19.
Clara Gowases, 59–60, Namibian politician, cancer.
Ismail Ibrahim, 87, Pakistani cricketer (Karachi).
Fred Jarvis, 95, British trade union leader, President of the Trades Union Congress (1987).
Renato de Jesus, 67, Brazilian politician, Rio de Janeiro MLA (1995–2011), complications from COVID-19.
Nagendra Nath Jha, 85, Indian diplomat, Lieutenant Governor of the Andaman and Nicobar Islands (2001–2004).
Badar Uddin Ahmed Kamran, 69, Bangladeshi politician, mayor of Sylhet (2003–2013), COVID-19.
Jan Peder Lamm, 84, Swedish archaeologist.
Beth Levine, 60, American physician, cancer.
Wolfram Lorenzen, 68, German pianist.
Seifu Makonnen, 68, Ethiopian Olympic boxer (1972).
Marinho, 63, Brazilian footballer (Atlético Mineiro, América, national team), pancreatitis and prostate cancer.
Robert S. Molaro, 69, American politician, member of the Illinois Senate (1993–2003) and Illinois House of Representatives (2003–2009).
Adebayo Osinowo, 64, Nigerian politician, member of the Senate (since 2019) and Lagos State House of Assembly (2003–2019), complications from COVID-19.
Michel Roquebert, 91, French historian and writer.
Jorge Rubio, 75, Mexican baseball player (California Angels).
Anton Schlembach, 88, German Roman Catholic prelate, Bishop of Speyer (1983–2007).
Kirk R. Smith, 73, American climatologist, cardiac arrest.
Phil Takahashi, 63, Canadian Olympic judoka (1984, 1988).
Nana Tuffour, 66, Ghanaian highlife singer.

16
Yuji Adachi, 56, Japanese guitarist and songwriter (Dead End), sepsis.
Mohammad Asghar, 74, Welsh politician, member of the Senedd (since 2007).
Abner M. Aust, 98, American Air Force colonel.
John Benfield, 68, British actor (Prime Suspect, Speed Racer, Cassandra's Dream), sarcoma.
Knut Bohwim, 89, Norwegian film director (Olsen Gang).
Roger Borniche, 101, French author and police detective.
Tamar Bornstein-Lazar, 93, Israeli children's writer.
Valério Breda, 75, Italian Roman Catholic prelate, Bishop of Penedo, Brazil (since 1997).
Martin T. Carey, 98, American entrepreneur and preservationist.
Danding Cojuangco, 85, Filipino food and beverage executive and politician, member of the House of Representatives (1969–1972), CEO and chairman of San Miguel Corporation.
Federico Corriente, 79, Spanish Arabist, lexicographer and academic (Royal Spanish Academy).
*Jannie van Eyck-Vos, 84, Dutch Olympic athlete (1964).
Ben Goto, 90, Japanese journalist and novelist, aspiration pneumonia.
Joan Hill, 89, American artist.
Haribhau Jawale, 66, Indian politician, MP (2009–2019), COVID-19.
Paul Kramer, 86, American politician, member of the New Jersey General Assembly (1992–2000).
John Madigan, 53, Australian politician, Senator (2011–2016), liver and bowel cancer.
Reavis L. Mitchell Jr., 72, American historian and academic administrator (Fisk University).
John J. Mooney, 90, American chemical engineer, stroke.
Peter Nguyen, 76, Hong Kong judge, Director of Public Prosecutions (1994–1997).
Edén Pastora, 83, Nicaraguan revolutionary and politician, respiratory failure.
Paulinho Paiakan, 67, Brazilian indigenous leader, COVID-19.
Patrick Poivey, 72, French actor (Loulou, Mune: Guardian of the Moon) and voiceover artist.
Ernest Poruthota, 88, Sri Lankan Roman Catholic prelate, Archbishop of Colombo (1987–1991).
John G. Richardson, 62, American politician, member and Speaker of the Maine House of Representatives (1998–2006), heart attack.
Robert D. Richardson, 86, American historian and biographer, complications from a fall.
Georgi Ryabov, 81, Estonian-born Russian footballer (Tallinna Dünamo, Dynamo Moscow, USSR national team).
John Joe Sheehan, 90, Irish Gaelic footballer (Kerry).
Alistair Soper, 83, New Zealand rugby union player (national team, Southland, Blackheath).
A. K. S. Usgaonkar, 92, Indian politician, Goa MLA.
Eusebio Vélez, 85, Spanish racing cyclist.
Charles Webb, 81, American novelist (The Graduate).

17
Marlene Ahrens, 86, Chilean javelin thrower and equestrian, Olympic silver medallist (1956), heart failure.
Harold David Anderson, 96, Australian public servant and diplomat.
Tariq Aziz, 84, Pakistani actor, television show host (Bazm E Tariq Aziz) and politician, MP (1997–1999).
Gordon H. Bower, 87, American cognitive psychologist.
Lewis John Carlino, 88, American screenwriter (I Never Promised You a Rose Garden) and director (The Great Santini), blood cancer.
William C. Dement, 91, American psychiatrist and sleep researcher, cardiovascular disease.
Terry Dicks, 83, British politician, MP (1983–1997).
Madanmohan Dutta, 62, Indian politician.
K. Anders Ericsson, 72, Swedish psychologist and scholar.
Victor Feldbrill, 96, Canadian conductor and violinist.
Dan Foster, 61, American radio broadcaster, COVID-19.
Hugh Fraser, 62, Canadian jazz musician, cancer.
Vic Gilliam, 66, American politician, member of the Oregon House of Representatives (2007–2017), amyotrophic lateral sclerosis.
Astrid Gjertsen, 91, Danish-born Norwegian politician, MP (1973–1989).
Arthur R. Gottschalk, 95, American politician.
Bill Groman, 83, American football player (Houston Oilers, Denver Broncos, Buffalo Bills).
Raimo Honkanen, 81, Finnish Olympic racing cyclist (1960, 1968).
Magda Kandil, 62, Egyptian economist.
György Kárpáti, 84, Hungarian water polo player, Olympic champion (1952, 1956, 1964).
Petr Král, 78, Czech poet.
William W. McCutcheon, 93, American police officer and politician.
David Morgan, 82, British sociologist.
Fabrice Philipot, 54, French racing cyclist.
Roberto Salmeron, 98, Brazilian electrical engineer.
*Jean Kennedy Smith, 92, American diplomat, ambassador to Ireland (1993–1998), Presidential Medal of Freedom winner, founder of VSA.
Michael E. Soulé, 84, American biologist, co-founder of the Society for Conservation Biology.
Jerry Sturm, 83, American football player (Calgary Stampeders, Denver Broncos, New Orleans Saints).
Willie Thorne, 66, English snooker player and commentator, leukaemia.
Trần Ngọc Châu, 96, Vietnamese soldier and politician, COVID-19.
Ronny Van Sweevelt, 57, Belgian Olympic racing cyclist (1984), food poisoning.
Pietro Zoppas, 86, Italian racing cyclist.

18
Tibor Benedek, 47, Hungarian water polo player, Olympic champion (2000, 2004, 2008), pancreatic cancer.
Claus Biederstaedt, 91, German actor (The Great Temptation, Don't Worry About Your Mother-in-Law, Before Sundown).
Anna Blume, 83, German art photographer.
John Bredenkamp, 79, Zimbabwean rugby union player (national team) and businessman.
Hux Brown, 75, Jamaican guitarist (Toots and the Maytals).
Arturo Chaires, 83, Mexican footballer (C.D. Guadalajara, national team).
Ali Kamal Etman, 79, Egyptian Olympic football player (1964) and coach.
Ingegärd Fredin, 89, Swedish freestyle swimmer.
Malim Ghozali PK, 71, Malaysian writer, cancer.
Breene Harimoto, 66, American politician, member of the Hawaii Senate (since 2015), pancreatic cancer.
Mikhail Ignatyev, 58, Russian politician, Head of the Chuvash Republic (2010–2020), bilateral pneumonia and complications from COVID-19.
Nicolas Joel, 67, French opera director, GM of Paris Opera (2009–2014), complications from a stroke.
Ellington Jordan, 80, American songwriter (I'd Rather Go Blind).
Jeffrey S. Juris, 48–49, American anthropologist.
Sergei Khrushchev, 84, Russian-American engineer.
Kossi Koudagba, 24, Togolese footballer (Espoir Tsevie, ASC Kara, national team).
Lachhman Singh Lehl, 96, Indian general and military historian.
Endre Lépold, 64, Hungarian Olympic sprinter (1976).
Dame Vera Lynn, 103, British singer ("We'll Meet Again", "The White Cliffs of Dover").
Francisco Moniz, 54, Angolan Olympic boxer.
Thomas S. Moorman Jr., 79, American Air Force general.
Sachy, 48, Indian screenwriter (Makeup Man) and film director (Anarkali, Ayyappanum Koshiyum), cardiac arrest.
Milo Sarens, 82, Belgian Olympic boxer (1960).
Alfred Schmidtberger, 90, Austrian Olympic sprint canoer.
Jules Sedney, 97, Surinamese economist and politician, Prime Minister (1969–1973) and Governor of the Central Bank of Suriname (1980–1983).
Antonio Veciana, 91, Cuban spy (CIA, Alpha 66).
Jim Young, 94, New Zealand boat builder and designer.

19
Waliur Rahman Bhuiyan, 67, Bangladeshi businessman.
Terry Brennan, 79, Irish Fine Gael politician.
Karen Bridge, 60, English badminton player, cancer.
Malcolm Brooks, 90, Australian politician, New South Wales MLA (1973–1976).
Thomas Brzustowski, 83, Polish-born Canadian engineer and academic.
Cho Hae-il, 79, South Korean writer.
Mario Corso, 78, Italian football player (Inter, national team) and manager (Mantova).
Madeline McWhinney Dale, 98, American economist and banker.
Ramchand Goala, 79, Bangladeshi cricket player (national team) and coach.
Ralph Haas, 87, Canadian engineer and academic.
Sir Ian Holm, 88, English actor (Alien, Chariots of Fire, The Lord of the Rings), BAFTA winner (1982), complications from Parkinson's disease.
Marjorie Hoy, 79, American entomologist.
Kevin Leahy, 71, Australian politician, Western Australian MLA (1989–1996) and MLC (2004–2005).
Thandi Mpambo-Sibhukwana, South African politician, MP (since 2019).
Dumitru Munteanu, 87, Romanian footballer (Petrolul Ploiești, Steaua București, national team).
David Perlman, 101, American science journalist (San Francisco Chronicle), cancer.
Karin Peschel, 84, German economist, rector of University of Kiel (1992–1996).
A. L. Raghavan, 87, Indian playback singer (Pona Machaan Thirumbi Vandhan, Kudumba Gouravam, Azhagarmalai Kalvan).
Carlos Ruiz Zafón, 55, Spanish novelist (The Prince of Mist, The Shadow of the Wind, The Prisoner of Heaven), colon cancer.
Regan Russell, 65, Canadian animal rights activist, traffic collision.
Vidyaben Shah, 97, Indian social worker.
Harry Smith, 69, British journalist.
Pat Stark, 90, American football player (Syracuse Orange) and coach (Rochester Yellowjackets).
Melville Y. Stewart, 85, American philosopher.
René Alphonse van den Berghe, 80, Belgian art dealer and convicted art thief, complications during surgery.
Noël Vandernotte, 96, French coxswain, Olympic bronze medallist (1936).

20
Dennis T. Avery, 84, American food writer and policy analyst.
Gerhard J. Bellinger, 89, German theologian.
Constance Curry, 86, American civil rights activist and writer, sepsis.
Ema Derossi-Bjelajac, 94, Croatian politician, President of the Presidency of SR Croatia (1985–1986).
Sylvio Capanema, 82, Brazilian jurist, COVID-19.
Joseph Ferris, 85, American politician, member of the New York State Assembly (1975–1984), COVID-19.
Svein Arne Hansen, 74, Norwegian sports official, president of the European Athletic Association (since 2015).
Angur Baba Joshi, 87, Nepali educationist and social activist, throat and breast cancer.
Jim Kiick, 73, American football player (Miami Dolphins, Denver Broncos), Super Bowl champion (1972, 1973), Alzheimer's disease.
Philip Latham, 91, British actor (The Troubleshooters, Dracula: Prince of Darkness, Ring of Spies).
Pedro Lima, 49, Portuguese actor (Ilha dos Amores, Second Life) and Olympic swimmer (1988, 1992), suicide.
Kamal Lohani, 85, Bangladeshi journalist, Director General of the Shilpakala Academy (2009–2011), COVID-19.
William Millerson, 67, Aruban-born Curaçaoan karateka and politician, chairman of the Estates of Curaçao (2017–2020).
Mufti Muhammad Naeem, 64, Pakistani Islamic scholar, co-founder of Jamia Binoria, COVID-19.
Joseph D. Patero, 88, American politician, member of the New Jersey General Assembly (1974–1986, 1988–1991).
Maria Lluïsa Oliveda Puig, 97, Spanish actress.
Robert L. Taylor, 95, American aviator.
Aaron Tokona, 45, New Zealand guitarist and singer (Weta, Cairo Knife Fight, Fly My Pretties), heart attack.
Max Tuerk, 26, American football player (Los Angeles Chargers, Arizona Cardinals, USC Trojans).
Usharani, 62, Indian actress (Puthiya Vaarpugal, Oru Oorla Oru Rajakumari, Millennium Stars), kidney failure.
John White, 77, Australian politician, Tasmanian MHA (1986–1998) and MLC (1998–1999).

21
Marconi Alencar, 81, Brazilian politician, COVID-19.
Sergio Salvador Aguirre Anguiano, 77, Mexican jurist, associate justice of the Supreme Court (1995–2012), stomach cancer.
György Bálint, 100, Hungarian horticulturist and politician, MP (1994–1998), COVID-19.
Lucius Barker, 92, American political scientist, complications from Alzheimer's disease.
Richárd Bicskey, 83, Hungarian Olympic cyclist (1964).
Sheela Borthakur, 84, Indian social worker.
Felicity Bryan, 74, British literary agent and journalist, stomach cancer.
Sergey Chilikov, 66, Russian photographer.
Pascal Clément, 75, French politician, Minister of Justice (2005–2007), pulmonary infection.
Rajinder Goel, 77, Indian cricketer (Delhi, Haryana, Southern Punjab).
Edward Grant, 93, American historian.
Jürgen Holtz, 87, German actor (Rosa Luxemburg, Made in Israel, Good Bye, Lenin!), complications from cancer.
Bill Horace, 44, Liberian fighter, shot.
Talib Jauhari, 80, Pakistani Islamic scholar, COVID-19.
Apinan Kaewpila, 35, Thai footballer (Samutsongkhram, TOT, Samut Sakhon), traffic collision.
Joseph Korto, Liberian politician, minister of education (2006-2010).
Angela Madsen, 60, American athlete, Paralympic bronze medallist (2012), drowned.
Hugh Mellor, 81, British philosopher.
Anthony J. Naldrett, 86, Canadian geologist.
Mile Nedelkoski, 84, Macedonian writer and poet.
Jeet Singh Negi, 95, Indian folk singer and composer.
Étienne Périer, 88, Belgian film director (Bridge to the Sun, When Eight Bells Toll, Zeppelin).
Bernardino Piñera, 104, Chilean Roman Catholic prelate, Bishop of Temuco (1960–1977) and Archbishop of La Serena (1983–1990), COVID-19.
Ahmed Radhi, 56, Iraqi football player (Al-Zawraa, national team) and manager (Al-Shorta), COVID-19.
Manny Santos, 85, Australian Olympic weightlifter (1956, 1960).
Sam Sarin, 84, Croatian-born Australian fisherman.
Ken Snow, 50, American soccer player (Chicago Power, St. Louis Steamers, national team), complications from COVID-19.
Florence M. Sullivan, 90, American politician, member of the New York State Assembly (1979–1983).
Zeev Sternhell, 85, Polish-born Israeli historian and political scientist.
Bobby Storey, 64, Irish IRA volunteer.
Badiuzzaman Tunu, 91, Bangladeshi military officer.
Bobana Veličković, 30, Serbian Olympic sport shooter (2012, 2016), complications from childbirth.
Joan Pau Verdier, 73, French singer.
Dennis Young, 90, New Zealand rugby union player (Canterbury, national team), cancer.

22
Vernon Alden, 97, American scholar, president of Ohio University.
Witold Baran, 80, Polish Olympic middle-distance runner (1964).
Pappukutty Bhagavathar, 107, Indian actor ('Sree Guruvayoorappan, Kattukurangu) and playback singer.
Steve Bing, 55, American entertainment executive (Shangri-La Entertainment), screenwriter and film producer (Kangaroo Jack, Rules Don't Apply), suicide by jumping.
Carlos Bosch, 75, Argentine photojournalist.
Dick Buerkle, 72, American Olympic runner (1976).
Nouri Dhiab, 76, Iraqi footballer (national team).
Jesus Dosado, 80, Filipino Roman Catholic prelate, Archbishop of Ozamiz (1981–2016).
Phil Krueger, 90, American football player, coach (Utah State Aggies, Fresno State Bulldogs), and general manager (Tampa Bay Buccaneers).
Carlos Luis Morales, 55, Ecuadorian footballer (Independiente, Emelec, national team) and politician, cardiocirculatory arrest.
Dick Oxtoby, 80, English footballer (Tranmere Rovers, Bolton Wanderers, Runcorn), Lewy body dementia.
Harry Penk, 85, English footballer (Wigan Athletic, Plymouth Argyle, Southampton).
Pierino Prati, 73, Italian footballer (Milan, Roma, national team), cancer.
Joel Schumacher, 80, American film director (The Lost Boys, Falling Down, Batman Forever), cancer.
Nisar Ahmed Siddiqui, 76, Pakistani academic.
Shirley Adelson Siegel, 101, American lawyer, complications from a stroke.
Stewart Speed, 77, New Zealand cricketer (Auckland).
Karlman Wasserman, 93, American physiologist (Wasserman 9-Panel Plot).
Thomas Welder, 80, American Benedictine nun and educator, President of the University of Mary (1978–2009), kidney cancer.

23
Saadi Toma Abbas, 81, Iraqi politician, Minister of Defence (1990–1991).
Vehbi Akdağ, 71, Turkish freestyle wrestler, Olympic silver medalist (1972).
Nikos Alefantos, 81, Greek football player (Atromitos Piraeus, Panegialios) and manager (Olympiacos), heart attack.
Ryan Anthony, 51, American trumpeter (Canadian Brass, Dallas Symphony Orchestra), multiple myeloma.
Harry Basch, 94, American actor (Falcon Crest).
Jean-Michel Bokamba-Yangouma, Congolese trade unionist and politician, COVID-19.
Xabiiba Cabdilaahi, 58, Djiboutian singer.
Lydia Chagoll, 89, Dutch-born Belgian dancer, choreographer and film director.
Lawrence Chelin, 61, South African footballer (Arcadia Shepherds, Durban City F.C., Atlanta Chiefs), leukaemia.
Shiraz Dharsi, 73, Indian cricketer (Sind, Karachi Blues, Scotland).
Nikolai Fadeyechev, 87, Russian ballet dancer and teacher, People's Artist of the USSR (1976).
Michael Falzon, 48, Australian musical actor and producer, cancer.
Aziz Ur Rahman Hazarvi, 72, Pakistani Islamic scholar.
Dick Jefferies, 88, English palaeontologist.
Arthur Keaveney, 68, Irish historian, COVID-19.
Jurjaan Koolen, 81, Dutch Olympic volleyball player (1964).
Li Zhensheng, 79, Chinese photojournalist, cerebral hemorrhage.
Jampel Lodoy, 44, Russian-Tuvan Buddhist lama, Kamby Lama of Tuva (2005–2010, since 2019), COVID-19.
Justin Love, 41, American basketball player (Saint Louis Billikens, Beijing Olympians, BC Odessa).
Mike McCool, 68, New Zealand rugby union player (Hawke's Bay, Wairarapa Bush, national team).
Robert Newton Peck, 92, American author (A Day No Pigs Would Die, Soup).
Margarita Pracatan, 89, Cuban novelty singer.
Francisco Javier Prado Aránguiz, 91, Chilean Roman Catholic prelate, Bishop of Rancagua (1993–2004) and Iquique (1984–1988), cancer.
Patricio Rodríguez, 81, Chilean tennis player, cancer.
Nilamber Dev Sharma, 88, Indian writer and literary scholar.
Liam Treadwell, 34, English National Hunt jockey.
César Bosco Vivas Robelo, 78, Nicaraguan Roman Catholic prelate, Bishop of León (1991–2019).

24
Gösta Ågren, 83, Finnish poet.
Alfredo Biondi, 91, Italian politician, MP (1968–1972, 1979–2008), Minister of Justice (1994–1995) and Environment (1983–1984).
Harry Britt, 82, American political activist, member (1979–1993) and president (1989–1990) of the San Francisco Board of Supervisors.
Robert L. Carneiro, 93, American anthropologist.
Étienne Cerexhe, 89, Belgian politician and judge, member of the Senate (1985–1987) and Chamber of Representatives (1988–1991).
Ding-Shinn Chen, 76, Taiwanese hepatologist, pancreatic cancer.
Lester Crystal, 85, American news executive (PBS NewsHour, NBC Nightly News), president of NBC News (1977–1979), stomach cancer and pneumonia.
Jacques Demêtre, 96, French blues historian.
Ralph Dunagin, 83, American cartoonist (The Middletons, Grin and Bear It).
Yuriy Dyachuk-Stavytskyi, 73, Ukrainian football player and manager (Spartak Ivano-Frankivsk, Karpaty Lviv).
Marc Fumaroli, 88, French historian and essayist.
Sir Anthony Hammond, 79, British lawyer and public servant, Treasury Solicitor (1997–2000).
Michael Hawley, 58, American educator, pianist and visual artist, colon cancer.
Alan Howard, 91, English nutritionist.
Roger Johnston, 90, Australian politician, member of the House of Representatives (1977–1980).
Eddie Kasko, 88, American baseball player (St. Louis Cardinals, Cincinnati Reds, Houston Astros) and manager (Boston Red Sox).
Claude Le Péron, 72, French bass guitarist.
David MacLennan, 82, Canadian biochemist.
Mohammed Yaseen Mohammed, 57, Iraqi Olympic weightlifter (1980, 1984), COVID-19.
Jane Parker-Smith, 70, British classical organist.
Britton Payne, 79, American curler.
Nigel Weiss, 83, South African astronomer and mathematician.

25
Perry Adkisson, 91, American entomologist and academic administrator, Chancellor of the Texas A&M University System (1986–1990).
Abiola Ajimobi, 70, Nigerian politician, Senator (2004–2007) and Governor of Oyo State (2011–2019), complications from COVID-19.
Suzana Amaral, 88, Brazilian film director and screenwriter (Hour of the Star, A Hidden Life).
A. J. Beirens, 73, Belgian radio producer and journalist, physician assisted suicide.
Nimai Bhattacharya, 89, Indian writer.
Chen Zhaoyuan, 89, Chinese engineer.
Patrice Gélard, 81, French politician, Senator (1995–2014).
Lester Grinspoon, 92, American psychiatrist and marijuana advocate (Marihuana Reconsidered).
Richard Grove, 64, British environmental historian.
Owen Harries, 90, Welsh-born Australian academic and magazine editor.
Huey, 32, American rapper ("Pop, Lock & Drop It"), shot.
Lonnie Ingram, 72, American microbiologist.
John Kennedy Sr., 91, Australian Hall of Fame football player and coach (Hawthorn, North Melbourne).
Olivier Le Fèvre, 59, French astrophysicist, brain cancer.
Tien-Yien Li, 75, Chinese-born American mathematician.
Emeka Mamale, 42, Congolese footballer (DC Motema Pembe, Kaizer Chiefs, national team).
Kilasu Massamba, 69, Congolese footballer (AS Dragons, national team).
Art Miller Jr., 73, American politician, member of the Michigan Senate (1977–2002), lung cancer.
Juan Ostoic, 89, Chilean Olympic basketball player (1952, 1956), heart failure.
Papaléo Paes, 67, Brazilian physician and politician, Senator (2003–2011) and Vice Governor of Amapá (2015–2018), complications from COVID-19.
Ionuț Popa, 67, Romanian football player and manager (UTA Arad, Bihor Oradea, Politehnica Iași).
Marga Richter, 93, American composer.
Joe Sinnott, 93, American Hall of Fame comic book artist (The Avengers, Thor, Fantastic Four).
Peter E. Toschek, 87, German physicist.
Maya Ulanovskaya, 87, American-born Russian-Israeli political dissident, writer and translator.
Ivan Utrobin, 86, Russian cross-country skier, Olympic bronze medalist (1964).

26
Fiona Adams, 84, British photographer.
Abdoulatifou Aly, 60, Malagasy-born French Mahoran politician, Deputy (2007–2012).
Kelly Asbury, 60, American animator and film director (Spirit: Stallion of the Cimarron, Shrek 2, Gnomeo & Juliet), abdominal cancer.
Pierre-Antoine-Jean Bach, 87, French-born Laotian Roman Catholic prelate, Vicar Apostolic of Savannakhet (1971–1975).
Katrin Beinroth, 38, German judoka, European open class champion (2003).
Hermes Binner, 77, Argentine politician, Governor of Santa Fe (2007–2011) and Mayor of Rosario (1995–2003), pneumonia.
Thomas Edwin Blanton Jr., 82, American terrorist and convicted murderer (16th Street Baptist Church bombing).
Francis Carnwath, 80, British banker and charity executive.
*Chen Peiqiu, 97, Chinese painter and calligrapher.
*Choi Suk-hyeon, 22, South Korean triathlete, suicide.
Ed Conroy, 73, Canadian politician, MLA for Rossland-Trail (1991–2001).
Stuart Cornfeld, 67, American film producer (Zoolander, Dodgeball: A True Underdog Story, Tropic Thunder), cancer.
James Dunn, 80, British theologian.
Sandra Feva, 73, American soul singer and composer.
Theo Foley, 83, Irish football player (Burnley, Northampton Town, national team).
Richard Gelles, 73, American sociologist, brain cancer.
Arnie Ginsburg, 93, American disc jockey (WMEX).
Milton Glaser, 91, American graphic designer, creator of the I ❤ NY slogan and co-founder of New York magazine, stroke and renal failure.
Bernhard van Haersma Buma, 88, Dutch politician, mayor of Workum (1962–1970) and Sneek (1970–1993).
Fred Hammer, 90, Luxembourgian sprinter (1952, 1956).
Munawar Hasan, 78, Pakistani politician, President of Jamaat-e-Islami Pakistan (2009–2014), COVID-19.
Margaret Jurgensmeier, 85, American baseball player (Rockford Peaches).
Tami Lynn, 77–78, American soul singer.
Diana Maddock, Baroness Maddock, 75, British politician, MP (1993–1997), Lord Temporal (since 1997) and President of the Liberal Democrats (1999–2000).
Félix de Almeida Mendonça, 92, Brazilian politician, Deputy (1983–1987, 1991–2011), complications from COVID-19.
Yordan Milanov, 95, Bulgarian military officer.
Faqir Nabi, 67, Afghan actor, COVID-19.
William Negri, 84, Italian footballer (Mantova, Bologna, national team).
Tony Pidgley, 72, British property developer and financier (Berkeley Group).
Jaroslav Pollák, 72, Slovak footballer (Sparta Prague, Austria Salzburg, national team).
Taryn Power, 66, American actress (The Count of Monte Cristo, Sinbad and the Eye of the Tiger, Eating), leukemia.
Ramon Revilla Sr., 93, Filipino actor (Iyo ang Tondo Kanya ang Cavite, Arrest: Pat. Rizal Alih, Exodus: Tales from the Enchanted Kingdom) and politician, Senator (1992–2004), heart failure.
Viola Sachs, 90, Polish professor of literature.
Don Seymour, 58, Canadian Hall of Fame jockey.
John Springall, 87, English cricketer (Nottinghamshire).
Julianus Kemo Sunarko, 78, Indonesian Roman Catholic prelate, Bishop of Purwokerto (2000–2016).
Arthur Williamson, 89, Scottish footballer (Southend United).

27
Belaid Abdessalam, 91, Algerian politician, Prime Minister (1992–1993).
Norman C. Anderson, 92, American politician.
Pete Carr, 70, American guitarist (LeBlanc and Carr, Muscle Shoals Rhythm Section).
Freddy Cole, 88, American jazz singer and pianist, complications from cardiovascular disease.
Linda Cristal, 89, Argentine actress (The Perfect Furlough, The High Chaparral, Mr. Majestyk).
Antonio Cuenco, 84, Filipino politician, member of the House of Representatives (1965–1969, 1987–1998, 2001–2010), COVID-19.
Julian Curry, 82, English actor (Rumpole of the Bailey, Sky Captain and the World of Tomorrow, Escape to Victory).
Adrian Devine, 68, American baseball player (Atlanta Braves, Texas Rangers), cancer.
Tom Finn, 71, American musician (The Left Banke) and DJ.
Susan Laughlin, 88, American politician.
Giuseppe Matarrese, 86, Italian Roman Catholic prelate, Bishop of Frascati (1989–2009).
Margaret Morton, 71, American photographer, leukemia.
Nwam Jar Thaing, 67, Burmese writer, heart failure.
Ilija Petković, 74, Serbian football player (OFK Beograd, Yugoslavia national team) and manager (national team), complications from perforated ulcer and COVID-19.
Nicola Quarta, 92, Italian politician, Deputy (1978–1983).
Mats Rådberg, 72, Swedish singer.
Mihai Romilă, 69, Romanian footballer (Politehnica Iași, Dunărea Galați, national team).
Luciano Rondinella, 86, Italian singer and actor.
Sander Schnitger, 61, Dutch air force general, Commander of the Royal Netherlands Air Force (2012–2016).
David Stronach, 89, Scottish archaeologist.
Bob Warner, 69, Canadian ice hockey player (Toronto Maple Leafs).
Khalid Wazir, 84, Pakistani cricketer (national team).
Jack Whittaker, 72, American Powerball lottery winner.
Tereza Souza Campos, 91, Brazilian socialite.

28
Nasir Ajanah, 64, Nigerian judge, Chief Judge of Kogi State (since 2004), COVID-19.
Rudolfo Anaya, 82, American author (Bless Me, Ultima).
Kim Bridgford, 60, American poet and professor, cancer.
Joe Bugel, 80, American football coach (Phoenix Cardinals, Oakland Raiders, Washington Redskins).
Zuriñe del Cerro, 64, Spanish feminist activist.
Marián Čišovský, 40, Slovak footballer (Inter Bratislava, Viktoria Plzeň, national team), amyotrophic lateral sclerosis.
Manuel Donley, 92, Mexican-born American Tejano singer and musician.
Simon H. Fell, 61, English bassist and composer.
Klaus Francke, 83, German politician, member of the Bundestag (1976–1998, 2001–2002).
Jim Holloway, American artist (Dungeons & Dragons).
Edward Kleinbard, 68, American lawyer and tax academic, cancer.
John Kneebone, 84, New Zealand farming leader.
Silvia Lazarte, 56, Bolivian politician, President of the Constituent Assembly (2006–2008).
Louis Mahoney, 81, Gambian-born British actor (Omen III: The Final Conflict, Doctor Who, Captain Phillips).
Bill McFarlane, 90, Canadian football player (Toronto Argonauts).
Matthew Morris, 51, Australian politician, New South Wales MP (2003–2011).
Geetha Nagabhushan, 78, Indian writer, cardiac arrest.
Dame Ingrid Roscoe, 76, English writer, Lord Lieutenant of West Yorkshire (2004–2018).
Jim Ross, 90, New Zealand educationalist and public servant.
Shen Jilan, 90, Chinese politician, delegate to the National People's Congress (since 1954), stomach cancer.
Mimi Soltysik, 45, American socialist activist, co-chair of the Socialist Party USA (2013–2015), liver cancer.
Md. Shahjahan Ali Talukder, 65, Bangladeshi politician, MP (1988–1990), COVID-19.
Yu Lan, 99, Chinese actress (A Revolutionary Family).

29
Bode Akindele, 88, Nigerian industrialist.
Efraín Barquero, 89, Chilean poet.
Richard Brooke, 93, British explorer.
Abdullah al Mohsin Chowdhury, 57, Bangladeshi civil servant, Defence Secretary (since 2020), complications from COVID-19.
James Paul Churchill, 96, American jurist, Judge (since 1974) and Chief Judge (1989) of the U.S. District Court for Eastern Michigan.
Gernot Endemann, 77, German actor (Sesamstraße).
James Douglas Henderson, 93, Canadian politician.
Hachalu Hundessa, 34, Ethiopian singer-songwriter, shot.
Jan Krajenbrink, 78, Dutch politician (House of Representatives, mayor of Woudenberg).
Gene Lakusiak, 78, Canadian football player (Winnipeg Blue Bombers), dementia.
Kamruddin Ahia Khan Majlish, Bangladeshi politician, cardiac arrest.
Johnny Mandel, 94, American composer ("Suicide Is Painless", "The Shadow of Your Smile", "Emily"), Grammy winner (1966).
Ernesto Marcel, 72, Panamanian boxer, WBA featherweight champion (1972–1974).
Paula Marckx, 94, Belgian model, journalist and pilot (Marckx v Belgium).
Benny Mardones, 73, American singer-songwriter ("Into the Night"), Parkinson's disease.
Marian Orzechowski, 88, Polish politician, Minister of Foreign Affairs (1985–1988).
Kevin Pay, 80, Australian footballer (Collingwood).
Svend Aage Rask, 84, Danish footballer (B 1909, national team).
Carl Reiner, 98, American actor, film director and writer (The Dick Van Dyke Show, Ocean's Eleven, The Jerk), Grammy winner (1999), nine-time Emmy winner, complications from a fall.
Ken Shadie, 84, Australian screenwriter (Crocodile Dundee), cancer.
Albert Sulon, 82, Belgian footballer (Club Liège, national team).
Anthony Terlato, 86, American winemaker.
Fredrick Töben, 76, German-born Australian Holocaust denier.
Willie Wright, 80, American soul singer.

30
Joe Arenas, 94, American football player (San Francisco 49ers).
Ivo Banac, 73, Croatian historian and politician, president of the Liberal Party (2003–2004), MP (2003–2008).
Tim Brooks, 72, American Hall of Fame professional wrestler (BTW, GCW, SCW), cancer.
Ludwig Finscher, 90, German musicologist (Die Musik in Geschichte und Gegenwart).
Jim Hargreaves, 70, Canadian ice hockey player (Vancouver Canucks).
Dan Hicks, 68, American actor (Evil Dead II, Darkman, Intruder), cancer.
Aleksandr Kabanov, 72, Russian water polo player, Olympic champion (1972, 1980).
Alfred Kotey, 52, Ghanaian Olympic boxer (1988), WBO bantamweight champion (1993–1994), complications from a stroke.
Tomio Kubota, 89, Japanese mathematician.
Henry Martin, 94, American cartoonist.
John Metras, 70, American-born Canadian football player (Hamilton Tiger-Cats).
J. Nagbe Sloh, 55, Liberian politician and media executive, member of the House of Representatives.

References

2020-06
 06